The 2001 Giro del Trentino was the 25th edition of the Tour of the Alps cycle race and was held on 30 April to 4 May 2001. The race started in Tione and finished in Arco. The race was won by Francesco Casagrande.

General classification

References

2001
2001 in road cycling
2001 in Italian sport